Ricky Dean Logan is an American actor and producer who has been in movies and on television.

His film credits include Back to the Future Part II, Back to the Future Part III as a different character, Freddy's Dead: The Final Nightmare, Buffy the Vampire Slayer and the Ice Nine Kills mini series "Welcome To Horrorwood".

Logan has made guest appearances on television shows, including "Seinfeld".

Selected filmography
 1989 Back to the Future Part II as Rafe "Data" Unger
 1990 Back to the Future Part III as Needles' Gang
 1990 Monday Morning as Reilly
 1991 Guilty as Charged as Landon
 1991 Freddy's Dead: The Final Nightmare as Carlos Rodriguez
 1992 Buffy the Vampire Slayer as Bloody Student
 1994 The Fantastic Four as Busboy
 1995 Joe's Rotten World as Bobby
 1997 Dilbert's Desktop Games (Video Game) as Wally (voice)
 1997 Psycho Sushi as Sean
 1999 Dark Spiral as Joey
 2000 More Dogs Than Bones as Morgue Attendant
 2004 Y.M.I. as Rocco
 2004 Straight-Jacket as Moron #1
 2005 L.A. Dicks as Ricky Dean
 2010 The Mentalist

External links

American male film actors
American male television actors
Living people
Year of birth missing (living people)
Place of birth missing (living people)